Hong Byung-sik (born 15 October 1969) is a South Korean biathlete. He competed at the 1988 Winter Olympics and the 1992 Winter Olympics.

References

External links
 

1969 births
Living people
South Korean male biathletes
Olympic biathletes of South Korea
Biathletes at the 1988 Winter Olympics
Biathletes at the 1992 Winter Olympics
Place of birth missing (living people)
Ski-orienteers at the 2011 Asian Winter Games
Asian Games medalists in biathlon
Biathletes at the 1986 Asian Winter Games
Asian Games bronze medalists for South Korea
Medalists at the 1986 Asian Winter Games
20th-century South Korean people
21st-century South Korean people